Curt Egon Thesing (21 April 1879, Danzig, West Prussia, today's Gdańsk, Poland – 25 May 1956, Bad Tölz, West Germany) was a German zoologist, publisher, populariser of science and translator.

Life
In 1913 Thesing joined Otto val Halem as partner and managing director of Veit and Comp. Following wartime propaganda collaboration with a German-Austrian publishers' association, Veit & Comp. was incorporated into Walter de Gruyter on 1 January 1919 – despite some political reservations from Thesing, who was on the political left. In May 1920 he withdrew as a partner from the firm for health reasons.

Works
Authored works
 Lectures on Biology. London: John Bale, Sons & Danielsson, 1910. Translated from the 2nd ed. by W. R. Boelter.
 Stammesgeschichte der Liebe, Berlin: Brehm, [1932]. Translated by Eden and Cedar Paul as Genealogy of love, London : Routledge, 1933. American edition Genealogy of sex: sex in its myriad forms, from the one-celled animal to the human being. New York: Emerson Books, 1934.
 Schule der Biologie , 1934. Translated by Eden and Cedar Paul as School of Biology, London: G. Routledge and sons, Ltd., 1935.
 
Translations
(tr. with Marguerite Thesing) Mein Leben und Work by Henry Ford. Leipzig: Paul List (publisher), 1923. Translated from  My Life and Work, New York: Doubleday, Page & Co., 1923
 (tr.) Hauptmann Sorrell und sein Sohn: roman by Warwick Deeping. Bremen: Schünemann, 1927. Translated from Sorrell and Son, London: Cassell & Co.
 (tr.) Der rote Handel droht! : Der Frotschritt des Fünfjahresplans der Sowjets by H. R. Knickerbocker. 1931. Translated from Fighting the Red trade menace
 (tr.) Bezwinger des Hungers by Paul Henry de Kruif. Berlin: Holle & Co. Verlag, [1934] . Translated from Hunger fighters.
 (tr.) Frau Buck and ihre Töchter. Roman by Warwick Deeping. Bremen: Carl Schünemann, Verlag, [1937]. Translated from The Road.

References

Further reading
 Horst Brasch, Lebensdauer. Erinnerung an Curt Thesing, einen deutschen Patrioten und Humanisten, Berlin (East), 1987
 Andreas Daum, Wissenschaftspopularisierung im 19. Jahrhundert. Bürgerliche Kultur, naturwissenschaftliche Bildung und die deutsche Öffentlichkeit  1848–1914, Munich, 1998, .

1879 births
1956 deaths
Scientists from Gdańsk
People from West Prussia
20th-century German zoologists
German publishers (people)
German Peace Society members
English–German translators
German male non-fiction writers
German translators